Baba Ahmad (also Romanized as Bābā Aḩmad) is a village in Baba Jik Rural District, in the Central District of Chaldoran County, West Azerbaijan Province, Iran. At the 2006 census, its population was 233, in 43 families.

References 

Populated places in Chaldoran County